Esmailabad (also Romanized as Esmā‘īlābād; also known as Ismā‘īlābād) is a village in Baghin Rural District, in the Central District of Kerman County, Kerman Province, Iran. At the 2006 census, its population was 33, in 9 families.

References 

Populated places in Kerman County